Vijayta Films Pvt Ltd is an Indian entertainment company owned by the Deol family. It started with Betaab (1983), the debut film of veteran actor, Dharmendra's son Sunny Deol and is most known for Ghayal (1990) starring Sunny Deol, which won seven Filmfare Awards.

Filmography

References

External links
 Vijayta Films at the Bollywood Hungama

Film distributors of India
Film production companies based in Mumbai
Indian companies established in 1983
Mass media companies established in 1983
1983 establishments in Maharashtra